USS Castle Rock (AVP-35) was a United States Navy Barnegat-class small seaplane tender in commission from 1944 to 1946 which saw service in the late months of World War II. After the war, she was in commission in the United States Coast Guard as the Coast Guard cutter USCGC Castle Rock (WAVP-383), later WHEC-383, from 1948 to 1971, seeing service in the Vietnam War during her Coast Guard career. Transferred to South Vietnam in 1971, she served in the Republic of Vietnam Navy as the frigate RVNS Trần Bình Trọng (HQ-05) and fought in the Battle of the Paracel Islands in 1974. When South Vietnam collapsed at the end of the Vietnam War in 1975, Trần Bình Trọng fled to the Philippines, where she served in the Philippine Navy from 1979 to 1985 as the frigate RPS (later BRP) Francisco Dagohoy (PF-10).

Construction and commissioning

Castle Rock was laid down on 12 July 1943 at Houghton, Washington, by the Lake Washington Shipyard, and was launched on 11 March 1944, sponsored by Mrs. R. W. Cooper. She commissioned on 8 October 1944.

U.S. Navy service

World War II

Castle Rock stood out of San Diego, California, on 18 December 1944 bound for Pearl Harbor, Hawaii, and Eniwetok, where she arrived on 28 January 1945. Assigned to escort convoys between Saipan, Guam, and Ulithi Atoll until 20 March 1945, Castle Rock then took up duties of tending seaplanes at Saipan. Her seaplanes carried out varied air operations, including reconnaissance, search, and antisubmarine warfare activities, while Castle Rock herself also performed local escort duties.

Post-World War II
On 28 November 1945, Castle Rock sailed from Saipan for Guam, where she embarked a group assigned to study Japanese defenses on Chichi Jima and Truk. This continued until 5 January 1946, when Castle Rock returned to seaplane tender operations at Saipan.

Castle Rock left Saipan on 9 March 1946, arriving at San Francisco, California, on 27 March 1946. She was decommissioned there on 6 August 1946

United States Coast Guard service

Barnegat-class ships were very reliable and seaworthy and had good habitability, and the Coast Guard viewed them as ideal for ocean station duty, in which they would perform weather reporting and search and rescue tasks, once they were modified by having a balloon shelter added aft and having oceanographic equipment, an oceanographic winch, and a hydrographic winch installed. After World War II, the U.S. Navy transferred 18 of the ships to the Coast Guard, in which they were known as the Casco-class cutters.

The U.S. Navy loaned Castle Rock to the Coast Guard on 16 September 1948. After undergoing conversion for use as a weather-reporting ship, she was commissioned into Coast Guard service as USCGC Castle Rock (WAVP-383) on 18 December 1948 at Mare Island Navy Yard, Vallejo, California.

North Atlantic and Caribbean

Castle Rock was stationed at Boston, Massachusetts, after her commissioning. Her primary duty was to serve on ocean stations in the Atlantic Ocean to gather meteorological data. While on duty in one of these stations, she was required to patrol a 210-square-mile (544-square-kilometer) area for three weeks at a time, leaving the area only when physically relieved by another Coast Guard cutter or in the case of a dire emergency. While on station, she acted as an aircraft check point at the point of no return, a relay point for messages from ships and aircraft, as a source of the latest weather information for passing aircraft, as a floating oceanographic laboratory, and as a search-and-rescue ship for downed aircraft and vessels in distress, and she engaged in law enforcement operations.

Castle Rock reported to Guantanamo Bay, Cuba, for service during the blockade of Cuba during the Cuban Missile Crisis in 1962.

Castle Rock took part in the United States Coast Guard Academy cadet cruise in May 1961, May 1963 and again in August 1965.  These cadet cruises were in company with the Coast Guard Training (barque) sailing ship, the CGC Eagle and at least one other Coast Guard cutter.

On 1 May 1966, Castle Rock was reclassified as a high endurance cutter and redesignated WHEC-383. On 26 September 1966 her period on loan to the Coast Guard ended when she was stricken from the Naval Vessel Register and transferred permanently to the Coast Guard.

Castle Rock was stationed at Portland, Maine, beginning in 1967, with the same duties she had as during her years at Boston.

Vietnam War service
Castle Rock was assigned to Coast Guard Squadron Three in South Vietnam in 1971. While on an R & R visit from South Vietnam, she suffered an engineering casualty and sank at her pier in Singapore, but returned to duty with the squadron upon completion of repairs. Castle Rock arrived in Vietnam on 30 July 1971. Coast Guard Squadron Three was tasked to operate in conjunction with U.S. Navy forces in Operation Market Time, the interdiction of North Vietnamese arms and munitions traffic along the coastline of South Vietnam during the Vietnam War. The squadron's other Vietnam War duties included fire support for ground forces, resupplying Coast Guard and Navy patrol boats, and search-and-rescue operations. Castle Rock served in this capacity until 21 December 1971.

Honors and awards
Castle Rock was awarded two campaign stars for her Vietnam War service, for:

Consolidation I 9 July 1971 – 30 November 1971
Consolidation II 1 December 1971 – 21 December 1971

Decommissioning

After her antisubmarine warfare equipment had been removed, the Coast Guard decommissioned Castle Rock  in South Vietnam on 21 December 1971, the day her Vietnam War tour ended.

Republic of Vietnam Navy service

On 21 December 1971, Castle Rock was transferred to South Vietnam, which commissioned her into the Republic of Vietnam Navy as the frigate RVNS Trần Bình Trọng. (HQ-05) was a South Vietnamese frigate of the Republic of Vietnam Navy in commission from 1971 to 1975. She and her six sister ships – all former Barnegat- and Casco-class ships transferred to South Vietnam in 1971 and 1972 and known in the Republic of Vietnam Navy as the s – were the largest warships in the South Vietnamese inventory, and their 5-inch (127-millimeter) guns were South Vietnam's largest naval guns.

Service history
Trần Bình Trọng and her sisters fought alongside U.S. Navy ships during the final years of the Vietnam War, patrolling the South Vietnamese coast and providing gunfire support to South Vietnamese forces ashore.

The Battle of the Paracel Islands

Possession of the Paracel Islands had long been disputed between South Vietnam and the People's Republic of China. With South Vietnamese forces stationed on the islands drawing down because they were needed on the Vietnamese mainland in the war with North Vietnam, China took advantage of the situation to send forces to seize the islands.

On 16 January 1974, the South Vietnamese frigate  spotted Chinese forces ashore on the islands. Both Lý Thường Kiệt and the Chinese ordered one another to withdraw, and neither side did. Reinforcements arrived for both sides over the next three days, including Trần Bình Trọng, which appeared on the scene on 18 January 1974 with the commander of the Republic of Vietnam Navy, Captain Hà Văn Ngạc, aboard.

By the morning of 19 January 1974, the Chinese had four corvettes and two submarine chasers at the Paracels, while the South Vietnamese had Trần Bình Trọng, Lý Thường Kiệt, the frigate , and the corvette  on the scene. Trần Bình Trọng landed South Vietnamese troops on Duncan Island (or Quang Hoa in Vietnamese), and they were driven off by Chinese gunfire. The South Vietnamese ships opened fire on the Chinese ships at 10:24 hours, and the 40-minute Battle of the Paracel Islands ensued. Nhật Tảo was sunk, and the other three South Vietnamese ships all suffered damage; not equipped or trained for open-ocean combat and outgunned, the South Vietnamese ships were forced to withdraw. Chinese losses were more difficult to ascertain, but certainly most or all of them suffered damage and one or two may have sunk.

The Chinese seized the islands the next day, and they have remained under the control of the People's Republic of China ever since.

Flight to the Philippines
When South Vietnam collapsed at the end of the Vietnam War in late April 1975, Trần Bình Trọng became a ship without a country. She fled to Subic Bay in the Philippines, packed with South Vietnamese refugees. On 22 and 23 May 1975, a U.S. Coast Guard team inspected Trần Bình Trọng and five of her sister ships, which also had fled to the Philippines in April 1975. One of the inspectors noted: "These vessels brought in several hundred refugees and are generally rat-infested. They are in a filthy, deplorable condition. Below decks generally would compare with a garbage scow."

Philippine Navy service

After Trần Bình Trọng had been cleaned and repaired, the United States formally transferred her to the Republic of the Philippines on 5 April 1976. She was commissioned into the Philippine Navy as the frigate RPS Francisco Dagohoy (PF-10) on 23 June 1979. In June 1980 she was reclassified and renamed BRP Francisco Dagohoy (PF-10). She and three other Barnegat- and Casco-class ships were known as the s in Philippine service and were the largest Philippine Navy ships of their time.

Modernization

The Andrés Bonifacio-class frigates were passed to the Philippine Navy with fewer weapons aboard than they had had during their U.S. Navy and U.S. Coast guard careers and with old surface search radars installed. The Philippine Navy addressed these shortfalls through modernization programs. In Philippine service, Francisco Dagohoy retained her South Vietnamese armament, consisting of a single Mark 12 5"/38 caliber (127-mm) gun, a dual-purpose weapon capable of anti-surface and anti-air fire, mounted in a Mark 30 Mod 0 enclosed base ring with a range of up to  yards; two twin Mark 1 Bofors 40mm anti-aircraft gun mounts, four Mk. 4 single 20-millimeter Oerlikon anti-aircraft gun mounts, four M2 Browning .50-caliber (12.7-millimeter) general-purpose machine guns, and two 81-mm mortars. However, in 1979 Hatch and Kirk, Inc., added a helicopter deck aft which could accommodate a Philippine Navy MBB Bo 105C helicopter for utility, scouting, and maritime patrol purposes, although the ship had no capability to refuel or otherwise support visiting helicopters. The Sperry SPS-53 surface search and navigation radar also was installed, replacing the AN/SPS-23 radar, although the ship retained both its AN/SPS-29D air search radar and its Mark 26 Mod 1 Fire Control Radar System. The Philippine Navy made plans to equip Francisco Dagohoy and her sister ships with new radar systems and long-range BGM-84 Harpoon anti-ship cruise missiles, but this upgrade did not materialize due to the worsening political and economic crisis in the Philippines in the mid-1980s.

Service history

Francisco Dagohoy served in the Philippine Navy until she was decommissioned along with two other Andrés Bonifacio-class frigates in June 1985. Unlike her two decommissioned sister ships, Francisco Dagohoy was never re-activated. She was discarded in March 1993 and probably scrapped.

Notes

References

Department of the Navy Naval Historical Center Online Library of Selected Images: U.S. Navy Ships: USS Castle Rock (AVP-35), 1944-1948
NavSource Online: Service Ship Photo Archive USS Castle Rock (AVP-35) USCGC Castle Rock (WAVP-383 WHEC-383)
United States Coast Guard Historians Office: Castle Rock, 1948 AVP-35; WAVP / WHEC-383
United States Coast Guard Historian's Office: Mackinac, 1949 WHEC-371
United States Coast Guard Historian's Office: Gresham, 1947 AGP-9; AVP-57; WAVP / WHEC / WAGW-387 ex-USS Willoughby Radio call sign: NODB
United States Coast Guard Historian's Office: McCulloch, 1946 WAVP / WHEC-386
 The Inventory of VNNs Battle Ships Part 1 
 Philippine Navy Official website
 Philippine Fleet Official Website
 Philippine Defense Forum
 Hazegray World Navies Today: Philippines
 Naming and Code Designation of PN Ships 
 Chesneau, Roger. Conways All the World's Fighting Ships 1922–1946. New York: Mayflower Books, Inc., 1980. .
Gardiner, Robert. Conway's All the Worlds Fighting Ships 1947-1982, Part I: The Western Powers. Annapolis, Maryland: Naval Institute Press, 1983. .
 Gray, Randal, Ed. Conways All the Worlds Fighting Ships 1947-1982 Part II: The Warsaw Pact and Non-Aligned Nations. Annapolis, Maryland: Naval Institute Press, 1983. .
 Moore, John, Captain, RN, FRGS, Ed. Janes Fighting Ships 1973-1974. London: Janes Yearbooks, 1973. No ISBN number.
 Moore, John, Captain, RN, Ed. Janes Fighting Ships 1980-1981. New York: Janes Publishing, Inc., 1980. .

World War II auxiliary ships of the United States
Barnegat-class seaplane tenders
Ships transferred from the United States Navy to the United States Coast Guard
Ships of the United States Coast Guard
Cold War patrol vessels of the United States
Ships transferred from the United States Navy to the Republic of Vietnam Navy
Ships transferred from the United States Navy to the Philippine Navy
Casco-class cutters
Vietnam War patrol vessels of the United States
1944 ships
Alaska-related ships
Weather ships
Trần Quang Khải-class frigates
Vietnam War frigates of South Vietnam
Ships of the Philippine Navy
Ships built at Lake Washington Shipyard